Lotoria armata is a species of predatory sea snail, a marine gastropod mollusk in the family Cymatiidae.

Description

Distribution

References

 Beu A.G. 1998. Indo-West Pacific Ranellidae, Bursidae and Personidae (Mollusca: Gastropoda). A monograph of the New Caledonian fauna and revisions of related taxa. Mémoires du Muséum national d'Histoire naturelle 178: 1-255

Cymatiidae
Gastropods described in 1897